The 2017 IMSA WeatherTech SportsCar Championship was the 47th season of the International Motor Sports Association (IMSA) GT Championship that traces its lineage to the 1971 IMSA GT Championship. It was the fourth season of the United SportsCar Championship and second under the name as the WeatherTech SportsCar Championship. It began on 28 January with the 24 Hours of Daytona, and ended on 7 October with the Petit Le Mans.

Classes
The class structure remained largely unchanged from 2016.
 Prototype (P)
 Prototype Challenge (PC)
 GT Le Mans (GTLM)
 GT Daytona (GTD)

Schedule

Race schedule

The 2017 schedule was released on 5 August 2016 and features twelve rounds.

Calendar changes

The dates of the Laguna Seca and Circuit of the Americas rounds were exchanged.
PC was removed from the lineup at the Long Beach, Lime Rock and Laguna Seca rounds in what was intended to be the final season for the class.
GTD was added to the lineup at Long Beach.

Television Coverage

The first 3 hours of the 24 Hours of Daytona and Long Beach were broadcast on Fox. The other rounds were all broadcast on Fox Sports 1, Fox Sports 2, and Fox Sports GO.

Entries

Prototype
The Prototype class is made up of LMP2 cars both in LMP2 trim, with the ACO specification Gibson V8 engine, and in Daytona Prototype International (DPi) trim, where manufacturers are allowed to alter certain body panels designed to reflect the automaker's design language, and run their own engines. Mazda (Riley Technologies), Cadillac (Dallara), and Nissan (Onroak Automotive) run chassis from the respective constructors featuring manufacturer-specific bodywork.

Prototype Challenge
All entries use an Oreca FLM09 chassis powered by a LS3 6.2 L V8 engine.

GT Le Mans

GT Daytona

Notes

Race results
Bold indicates overall winner.

Championship standings

Points systems
Championship points are awarded in each class at the finish of each event. Points are awarded based on finishing positions as shown in the chart below.

Drivers points
Points are awarded in each class at the finish of each event. The point for the fastest lap is only awarded in the drivers' championship.

Team points
Team points are calculated in exactly the same way as driver points, using the point distribution chart. Each car entered is considered its own "team" regardless if it is a single entry or part of a two-car team.

Manufacturer points
There are also a number of manufacturer championships which utilize the same season-long point distribution chart. The manufacturer championships recognized by IMSA are as follows:

Prototype (P): Chassis Constructor
GT Le Mans (GTLM): Car Manufacturer
GT Daytona (GTD): Car Manufacturer

Each manufacturer receives finishing points for its highest finishing car in each class. The positions of subsequent finishing cars from the same manufacturer are not taken into consideration, and all other manufacturers move up in the order.

Example: Manufacturer A finishes 1st and 2nd at an event, and Manufacturer B finishes 3rd. Manufacturer A receives 35 first-place points while Manufacturer B would earn 32 second-place points.

North American Endurance Cup
The points system for the North American Endurance Cup is different from the normal points system. Points are awarded on a 5-4-3-2 basis for drivers, teams and manufacturers. The first finishing position at each interval earns five points, four points for second position, three points for third, with two points awarded for fourth and each subsequent finishing position.

At Daytona (24 hour race), points are awarded at six hours, 12 hours, 18 hours and at the finish. At the Sebring (12 hour race), points are awarded at four hours, eight hours and at the finish. At Watkins Glen (6 hour race), points are awarded at three hours and at the finish. At Road Atlanta (10 hour race), points are awarded at four hours, eight hours and at the finish.

Like the season-long team championship, North American Endurance Cup team points are awarded for each car and drivers get points in any car that they drive, in which they are entered for points. The manufacturer points go to the highest placed car from that manufacturer (the others from that manufacturer not being counted), just like the season-long manufacturer championship.

For example: in any particular segment manufacturer A finishes 1st and 2nd and manufacturer B finishes 3rd. Manufacturer A only receives first-place points for that segment. Manufacturer B receives the second-place points.

Drivers' championships

Prototype

Notes
1 – Relegated to last in class for violation of minimum drive time requirements.

Prototype Challenge

GT Le Mans

GT Daytona

Teams' championships

Prototype

Prototype Challenge

GT Le Mans

GT Daytona

Manufacturers' championships

Prototype

GT Le Mans

GT Daytona

References

 
WeatherTech SportsCar Championship seasons